Lawledge is an unincorporated area and community in Census division 23 in Northern Manitoba, Canada.

History
Lawledge was founded with the building of the Hudson Bay Railway in the third decade of the 20th century. When the originally intended final section line route north east to Port Nelson was abandoned, the construction of the new route of the final section from Amery ( to the south) north to Churchill, which opened in 1929, led to its founding. Lawledge lies on the line between the communities of Weir River to the south and Thibaudeau to the north.

Transportation
Lawledge is the site of Lawledge railway station, served by the Via Rail Winnipeg–Churchill train. It has a passing loop.

References

Unincorporated communities in Northern Region, Manitoba